"Design to Standards" means to design items with generally accepted and uniform procedures, dimensions or materials.

Benefits
Product standardization is a technique in engineering design that aim to reduce the number of different parts within a product. The benefits are:
 lower supply chain costs
 product platforms
 faster product design
The supply chain costs are simple to reason:
 less variety of supplier, less supplier in numbers
 less stock keeping units (SKU)
 more economics of scale
 less variety of production operations
Product platforms are enabled through:
 standardized parts can be re-utilized across a product family
 standardized parts can be re-utilized across product generations
The product design process becomes faster because:
 standardized parts can be pulled from an engineering database
 already standardized parts do not need to be designed again

Standards
Standardization can occur through two ways
 industry standard setter
 company standards

Design for X
Standards